Weston Corbett is a hamlet and civil parish in Hampshire and lies three miles south from Basingstoke. There is only one mention of Weston Corbett in the Domesday Survey of 1086. The first reference to Weston Corbett occurs in 1224, when the land belonged to the Crown and was held by Thomas Corbett. Although the Corbett family gave their name to the parish, the land at Weston Corbett has subsequently changed hands many times.

In 1316, Weston Corbett was a hamlet but, by 1801, there were only 10 inhabitants. The population has increased slightly since this date, but the settlement still comprises only a few houses and two farms. A church is known to have existed, and was first mentioned in 1305. It was, however, in ruins by the end of the 16th century. The site of the church is not known, although it is believed to have been sited north or west of Manor Farm.

See also
 Weston Patrick
 The Hundred of Odiham

References

Further reading
 Hugh Bedford and David Don Weston Patrick and Weston Corbett: The Story of Two Villages 2009 (available from St. Lawrence Church)

Villages in Hampshire
Civil parishes in Basingstoke and Deane